In six-dimensional geometry, a pentellated 6-simplex is a convex uniform 6-polytope with 5th order truncations of the regular 6-simplex.

There are unique 10 degrees of pentellations of the 6-simplex with permutations of truncations, cantellations, runcinations, and sterications. The simple pentellated 6-simplex is also called an expanded 6-simplex, constructed by an expansion operation applied to the regular 6-simplex. The highest form, the pentisteriruncicantitruncated 6-simplex, is called an omnitruncated 6-simplex with all of the nodes ringed.

Pentellated 6-simplex

Alternate names 

 Expanded 6-simplex
 Small terated tetradecapeton (Acronym: staf) (Jonathan Bowers)

Coordinates 

The vertices of the pentellated 6-simplex can be positioned in 7-space as permutations of (0,1,1,1,1,1,2). This construction is based on facets of the pentellated 7-orthoplex.

A second construction in 7-space, from the center of a rectified 7-orthoplex is given by coordinate permutations of:
 (1,-1,0,0,0,0,0)

Root vectors 

Its 42 vertices represent the root vectors of the simple Lie group A6. It is the vertex figure of the 6-simplex honeycomb.

Images

Pentitruncated 6-simplex

Alternate names 
 Teracellated heptapeton (Acronym: tocal) (Jonathan Bowers)

Coordinates 
The vertices of the runcitruncated 6-simplex can be most simply positioned in 7-space as permutations of (0,1,1,1,1,2,3). This construction is based on facets of the runcitruncated 7-orthoplex.

Images

Penticantellated 6-simplex

Alternate names 
 Teriprismated heptapeton (Acronym: topal) (Jonathan Bowers)

Coordinates 
The vertices of the runcicantellated 6-simplex can be most simply positioned in 7-space as permutations of (0,1,1,1,1,2,3). This construction is based on facets of the penticantellated 7-orthoplex.

Images

Penticantitruncated 6-simplex

Alternate names 
 Terigreatorhombated heptapeton (Acronym: togral) (Jonathan Bowers)

Coordinates 
The vertices of the penticantitruncated 6-simplex can be most simply positioned in 7-space as permutations of (0,1,1,1,2,3,4). This construction is based on facets of the penticantitruncated 7-orthoplex.

Images

Pentiruncitruncated 6-simplex

Alternate names 
 Tericellirhombated heptapeton (Acronym: tocral) (Jonathan Bowers)

Coordinates 
The vertices of the pentiruncitruncated 6-simplex can be most simply positioned in 7-space as permutations of (0,1,1,1,2,3,4). This construction is based on facets of the pentiruncitruncated 7-orthoplex.

Images

Pentiruncicantellated 6-simplex

Alternate names 
 Teriprismatorhombated tetradecapeton (Acronym: taporf) (Jonathan Bowers)

Coordinates 
The vertices of the pentiruncicantellated 6-simplex can be most simply positioned in 7-space as permutations of (0,1,1,2,3,3,4). This construction is based on facets of the pentiruncicantellated 7-orthoplex.

Images

Pentiruncicantitruncated 6-simplex

Alternate names 
 Terigreatoprismated heptapeton (Acronym: tagopal) (Jonathan Bowers)

Coordinates 
The vertices of the pentiruncicantitruncated 6-simplex can be most simply positioned in 7-space as permutations of (0,1,1,2,3,4,5). This construction is based on facets of the pentiruncicantitruncated 7-orthoplex.

Images

Pentisteritruncated 6-simplex

Alternate names 
 Tericellitruncated tetradecapeton (Acronym: tactaf) (Jonathan Bowers)

Coordinates 
The vertices of the pentisteritruncated 6-simplex can be most simply positioned in 7-space as permutations of (0,1,2,2,2,3,4). This construction is based on facets of the pentisteritruncated 7-orthoplex.

Images

Pentistericantitruncated 6-simplex

Alternate names 
 Great teracellirhombated heptapeton (Acronym: gatocral) (Jonathan Bowers)

Coordinates 
The vertices of the pentistericantittruncated 6-simplex can be most simply positioned in 7-space as permutations of (0,1,2,2,3,4,5). This construction is based on facets of the pentistericantitruncated 7-orthoplex.

Images

Omnitruncated 6-simplex

The omnitruncated 6-simplex has 5040 vertices, 15120 edges, 16800 faces (4200 hexagons and 1260 squares), 8400 cells, 1806 4-faces, and 126 5-faces. With 5040 vertices, it is the largest of 35 uniform 6-polytopes generated from the regular 6-simplex.

Alternate names 
 Pentisteriruncicantitruncated 6-simplex (Johnson's omnitruncation for 6-polytopes)
 Omnitruncated heptapeton
 Great terated tetradecapeton (Acronym: gotaf) (Jonathan Bowers)

Permutohedron and related tessellation 

The omnitruncated 6-simplex is the permutohedron of order 7. The omnitruncated 6-simplex is a zonotope, the Minkowski sum of seven line segments parallel to the seven lines through the origin and the seven vertices of the 6-simplex.

Like all uniform omnitruncated n-simplices, the omnitruncated 6-simplex can tessellate space by itself, in this case 6-dimensional space with three facets around each hypercell.

Coordinates 

The vertices of the omnitruncated 6-simplex can be most simply positioned in 7-space as permutations of (0,1,2,3,4,5,6). This construction is based on facets of the pentisteriruncicantitruncated 7-orthoplex, t0,1,2,3,4,5{35,4}, .

Images

Full snub 6-simplex 

The full snub 6-simplex or omnisnub 6-simplex, defined as an alternation of the omnitruncated 6-simplex is not uniform, but it can be given Coxeter diagram  and symmetry +, and constructed from 14 snub 5-simplexes, 42 snub 5-cell antiprisms, 70 3-s{3,4} duoantiprisms, and 2520 irregular 5-simplexes filling the gaps at the deleted vertices.

Related uniform 6-polytopes 
The pentellated 6-simplex is one of 35 uniform 6-polytopes based on the [3,3,3,3,3] Coxeter group, all shown here in A6 Coxeter plane orthographic projections.

Notes

References
 H.S.M. Coxeter: 
 H.S.M. Coxeter, Regular Polytopes, 3rd Edition, Dover New York, 1973 
 Kaleidoscopes: Selected Writings of H.S.M. Coxeter, edited by F. Arthur Sherk, Peter McMullen, Anthony C. Thompson, Asia Ivic Weiss, Wiley-Interscience Publication, 1995,  
 (Paper 22) H.S.M. Coxeter, Regular and Semi Regular Polytopes I, [Math. Zeit. 46 (1940) 380-407, MR 2,10]
 (Paper 23) H.S.M. Coxeter, Regular and Semi-Regular Polytopes II, [Math. Zeit. 188 (1985) 559-591]
 (Paper 24) H.S.M. Coxeter, Regular and Semi-Regular Polytopes III, [Math. Zeit. 200 (1988) 3-45]
 Norman Johnson Uniform Polytopes, Manuscript (1991)
 N.W. Johnson: The Theory of Uniform Polytopes and Honeycombs, Ph.D. 
  x3o3o3o3o3x - staf, x3x3o3o3o3x - tocal, x3o3x3o3o3x - topal, x3x3x3o3o3x - togral, x3x3o3x3o3x - tocral, x3x3x3x3o3x - tagopal, x3x3o3o3x3x - tactaf, x3x3x3o3x3x - tacogral, x3x3x3x3x3x - gotaf

External links 
 
 Polytopes of Various Dimensions
 Multi-dimensional Glossary

6-polytopes